Hasan Dosti (1895January 29, 1991) was an Albanian jurist and politician. Being a staunch Albanian nationalist, Dosti was considered by the Albanian communists to be one of their greatest enemies.

Biography

Early life
Hasan Dosti was born in Albania (then part of the Ottoman Empire) in the village of Kardhiq near Gjirokastra, to Elmaz Aga of the Dosti branch of Muslim Albanian Tosk household Dosti-Hajdaragaj. Back then the village was part of the Ottoman Empire and belonged to the Vilayet of Janina with majority Albanian population. He attended the schools in Filippiada and the Philosophy Zosimaia School in Ioannina. His family moved to Vlora after World War I, where Dosti came into contact with Avni Rustemi. Dosti then moved to Paris to complete his tertiary education at the faculty of law of the University of Paris. After graduating, he returned to Albania to work as a lawyer. In the 1920s he served a member of court of cassation of Albania under Thoma Orollogaj, who was the minister of justice at the time.

Opposition to monarchy
An opponent of Ahmet Zogu, he was imprisoned several times. From 1932 to 1935 he was sentenced to prison because of his participation in the Movement of Vlorë, an anti-monarchist organization founded by Dosti himself and Skënder Muço among others. In the late 1930s he organized an assassination plot against leading Italian and Albanian fascists.

Balli Kombëtar
In 1941 he initially became Minister of Justice in Mustafa Merlika-Kruja's cabinet under Italian occupation; however, in 1943 Dosti defected and joined the Balli Kombëtar. He was a leading figure of the Balli Kombëtar during World War II and was one of Balli Kombëtar's representatives in the Assembly of Mukje after he left the government in June 1942. With the communists on the brink of victory, Hasan Dosti managed to escape to Italy in a boat provided by the Abwehr.

Exile
Hasan Dosti emigrated to the United States from Italy in 1949 and became head of the National Committee for a Free Albania after Mit'hat Frashëri's death. The "National Committee for a Free Albania" was an organisation that was part of the National Committee for a Free Europe seeking to undermine Communist rule in Eastern Europe. He dismissed as Communist propaganda assertions that Albanian emigres included collaborators with the Axis powers during the war.

He sought to bring about unity with the Prizren Committee, expressing the view that the liberation of Albania could be utilised effectively to bring about the overthrow of the government led by Enver Hoxha. Hasan Dosti felt that Yugoslav promises not to establish by force a Titoist government in Albania were not completely reliable, but that if such a government was established it would at least remove Albania from the Soviet orbit. However, official circles in Washington and London did not share Dosti's views, and the United States government presented an aide-memoire to Yugoslavia stating that it would “look with concern on efforts by any interested nation to take unilateral action vis-a-vis Albania”.

Death
Hasan Dosti died at the age of 96. He had eight children, Luan, of Los Angeles, an aerospace engineer; and seven others who remained in Albania, including Shano Sokoli, Viktor Dosti, Tomorr Dosti, Ernest Dosti and Veronika Dine who spent their lives under Albania's Stalinist regime in labor camps and prisons. After the fall of communism, his son Tomor Dosti served as a deputy chairman of the anti-Communist Democratic Party, was elected as a deputy of the Albanian parliament in the 1990s.

Sources 

1895 births
1991 deaths
People from Gjirokastër
People from Janina vilayet
20th-century Albanian judges
Balli Kombëtar
University of Paris alumni
Albanian anti-communists
Zosimaia School alumni
20th-century Albanian politicians
Government ministers of Albania
Justice ministers of Albania
Albanian collaborators with Nazi Germany
Albanian expatriates in the United States
Albanian people of World War II
Albanian expatriates in France